Linsey Michelle Godfrey (born July 25, 1988) is an American actress. She played Caroline Spencer on the CBS soap opera The Bold and the Beautiful from March 2012 to October 2016, before returning in a recurring capacity from December 2016 to March 2018. She played Sarah Horton on the NBC soap opera Days of Our Lives from July 2018 to March 2021 before returning in January 2022.

Early life
Godfrey was raised in Stuart, Florida where she lived with her mother, Char Griggs. Godfrey attended South Fork High School before she moved to Los Angeles to further her acting career. She is an accomplished angler. In 2006, Godfrey was visiting her family in Tallahassee when she was diagnosed with Hodgkin's lymphoma. She completed treatment in seven months and returned to Los Angeles to continue her acting career. She designed the survivor ribbon tattooed on the back of her neck.

Career
Godfrey's acting career began as a freshman at South Fork High School, when she unexpectedly replaced an ill student; she was then discovered by a talent manager at a state thespian competition. Godfrey commuted to the Los Angeles-based agency's satellite office in Titusville for a year before being allowed to visit California with her mother and audition there. Her family took out a loan, and her step-father worked three jobs to finance these visits. Eventually, her mother left her in the care of friends and her management team so she could return to work. Godfrey booked roles on One Tree Hill and Surface before being diagnosed with Hodgkin's lymphoma; she estimates cancer set her career back by two years. Upon returning to Hollywood, Godfrey booked several guest-starring roles and landed a role on The Bold and the Beautiful as series regular Caroline Spencer. In July 2018, it was announced she joined the cast of Days of Our Lives as Sarah Horton. In March 2021, Godfrey announced her departure from the soap, exiting on March 29. On January 7, 2022, it was announced that Godfrey would be reprising her role, during the week of January 17.

Personal life
On December 5, 2013, it was announced that Godfrey was expecting her first child with boyfriend, The Young and the Restless actor Robert Adamson. She gave birth to a daughter Aleda Seren Adamson, on June 12, 2014. In August 2014, Godfrey helped to raise awareness of the disease ALS by participating in the Ice Bucket Challenge. On August 3, 2015, after months of speculation, a representative for The Bold and the Beautiful confirmed that Adamson and Godfrey had ended their engagement; however, they would continue to raise their daughter "in a loving and amicable environment and her needs will always be their common priority." In late-2017, Godfrey began a relationship with actor Breckin Meyer. She was injured in an automobile accident on February 2, 2015 after being struck by a moving car while walking on the sidewalk in Los Angeles. While it was initially reported that both of her legs were broken, a rep for the actress said it was only her ankles that were injured and she is expected to make a full recovery. In May 2019, Godfrey publicly stated that she had an abortion and that she did not regret her decision to get one. On March 9, 2021, Godfrey revealed on Instagram that she has been diagnosed with bipolar 2 and borderline personality disorder. Godfrey is a celebrity ambassador for the NGO INARA. Founded by Arwa Damon in 2015, the organization provides medical treatment to children injured as a result of war. She came out as bisexual in 2021.

Filmography

Film

Television

Awards and nominations

References

External links 

1988 births
Actresses from Florida
American child actresses
American soap opera actresses
American television actresses
Living people
People from Stuart, Florida
People with bipolar disorder
People with borderline personality disorder
LGBT people from Florida
Bisexual actresses
21st-century American women
American bisexual actors